In mathematics, specifically in category theory, an extranatural transformation is a generalization of the notion of natural transformation.

Definition
Let  and  be two functors of categories.
A family  is said to be natural in a and extranatural in b and c if the following holds:
 is a natural transformation (in the usual sense).

 

Properties 
Extranatural transformations can be used to define wedges and thereby ends (dually co-wedges and co-ends), by setting  (dually ) constant.

Extranatural transformations can be defined in terms of dinatural transformations, of which they are a special case.

See also 
 Dinatural transformation

External links

References 

Higher category theory